Oloron-Sainte-Marie is a railway station in Oloron-Sainte-Marie, Nouvelle-Aquitaine, France. The station is on the Pau–Canfranc railway. Since 2016, the station is served by TER (local) services from Pau to Bedous operated by the SNCF.

Train services
The following services currently call at Oloron-Sainte-Marie:
local service (TER Nouvelle-Aquitaine) Pau - Bedous

References

Railway stations in Pyrénées-Atlantiques
Railway stations in France opened in 1883